Ritchies Transport is a New Zealand private bus operator, owned by KKR. It was established in 1972 and describes itself as "the largest privately owned bus and coach transport operator in New Zealand" with a fleet of over 1500 vehicles spread across depots nationwide. It owns a 46% stake in InterCity.

Services
Richies operates coach services for several package tour operators, as well as urban services, usually under contract to local councils:
Auckland: Ritchies' main urban bus operations are in Auckland, operating out of depots in Swanson and Albany servicing West Auckland including Helensville and the North Shore. Ritchies also operates high-speed Northern Express NX1 services on the Northern Busway on Auckland's North Shore, under contract to Auckland Transport.
Blenheim: Ritchies operate the local bus service in Blenheim under contract to the Marlborough District Council. There are two loops that service the town.
Christchurch: With deregulation of bus services Ritchies entered the Christchurch urban market with a number of routes using various buses purchased from other companies, including the Auckland Regional Authority, Invercargill City Transport, Timaru City Transport and New Plymouth City Buses. In January 1997, Ritchies sold its Christchurch urban contracts to Christchurch Transport Ltd but retained ownership of the buses. It was announced on 4 November that Ritchies has purchased the assets of Red Bus Ltd for an undisclosed sum. Red Bus operates a number of urban services from the airport area to the south east of the city.
Dunedin: Ritchies amalgamated Dunedin bus lines Turnbull Motors, Peninsular Motor Services and Southern Services in 1975. Since then, Ritchies has operated urban services in Dunedin from time to time. From 1 July 2011, it has operated the Opoho–Shiel Hill, Pine Hill–Lookout Point, and University–Concord routes.
Queenstown: In 2016, Ritchies took over Connectabus, Queenstown's privately owned public transport service and continues to run the services. In 2017, Ritchies bought out Alpine Connexions in Wanaka, integrating their Queenstown–Wanaka services into its own.
Timaru and Temuka: Ritchies was founded in this small South Canterbury city. They have operated four Timaru urban bus routes contracted to Metro since 28 June 2010, previously operated by Christchurch Bus Services. They also run the Timaru–Temuka bus route.

See also
 Public transport in New Zealand
 Public transport in Auckland
 Public transport in Christchurch
 Public transport in Dunedin
 Public transport in Invercargill
 Public transport in Wellington

References

External links
Company website

Bus companies of New Zealand
Kohlberg Kravis Roberts companies
Transport companies established in 1972
New Zealand companies established in 1972